Madina Erasylqyzy Abilqasymova (Madina Erasylqyzy Äbılqasymova; born 1 August 1978) is a Kazakh politician who's serving as the chair of the Agency of the Republic of Kazakhstan for the Regulation and Development of the Financial Market. Prior to that, she served as a Minister of Labour and Social Protection of the Population from 2018 to 2019.

Biography

Early life and education 
Born in Alma-Ata, Abilqasymova graduated from the Narxoz University in 1999 in the specialty "International Economic Relations". In 2003, she earned master's at the Columbia University in International Relations, majoring in Economic Policy Management and then from the John F. Kennedy School of Government in the Harvard University with a master in Public Administration.

Career 
In 1999, Abilqasymova became a chief specialist of the Agency of the Republic of Kazakhstan for Strategic Planning. From 2003 to 2004, she was the head of the Strategic Planning Department of the Ministry of Economy and Budget Planning. In 2004, she became the director of the Department of State Policy Analysis of JSC Center for Marketing and Analytical Research. From 2006 to 2008, Abilqasymova served as the deputy head of the Socio-Economic Department of the Prime Minister's Office. In 2008, she became the head of the Center for Strategic Research and Analysis of the Presidential Administration.

From 2011 to 2013, she was a Vice Minister of Economic Development and Trade of Kazakhstan. In 2012, Abilqasymova became the Deputy Governor from Kazakhstan at the World Bank. From 2013 to 2014, she served as a Vice Minister of Economy and Budget Planning. In August 2014, Abilqasymova became the Vice Minister of National Economy. In 2015, while working as Vice Minister, Abilqasymova went on maternity leave, and Aidar Arifhanov was temporarily appointed to her position.

On 8 February 2018, she was appointed as the Minister of Labor and Social Protection of the Population. During her tenure, in January 2019, Abilqasymova announced an increase in benefits for mothers with many children from 15.4 to 16.1 thousand tenge. According to her, in other countries, there are practically no such privileges, for all the years of life in Kazakhstan, mothers receive several million tenge, and the benefit is paid for life. This statement caused a huge wave of criticism. Mothers with many children argued that this small allowance does not provide real help. The criticism intensified after a fire in Astana on the night of 4 February 2019, which killed five girls. After these events, Kazakh citizens in social networks began to blame Abilqasymova for the plight of large families, which caused the fire, and actively began to demand the minister's resignation. After the government was dismissed on 21 February 2019, Abilqasymova was appointed as the First Vice Minister of National Economy on 12 March 2019.

On 28 March 2019, she became the deputy chair of the National Bank of Kazakhstan.

Since 18 December 2019, Abilqasymova has been serving as the chair of the Agency of the Republic of Kazakhstan on Regulation and Development of the Financial Market.

Personal life  
Abilqasymova is married and has 3 children. Her father Erasyl Abilqasymov (born 1948) is a known doctor, author of the book "The system of compulsory health insurance in the Republic of Kazakhstan", member of the 2nd Mazhilis, and a candidate in the 2005 Kazakh presidential election.

Reference 

1978 births
Living people
21st-century Kazakhstani women politicians
21st-century Kazakhstani politicians
People from Almaty
Government ministers of Kazakhstan
School of International and Public Affairs, Columbia University alumni
Harvard Kennedy School alumni
Narxoz University alumni